Secret Service is a lost 1919 American silent American Civil War drama film starring Robert Warwick and directed by Hugh Ford. It was produced by Famous Players-Lasky and distributed by Paramount Pictures. Based on the play Secret Service by William Gillette (New York, 5 Oct 1896), it was remade as a talking picture by RKO in 1931.

One of the story’s chief plot twists is referenced in the 1923 short story "Devil Cat", featuring Carroll John Daly’s hard boiled detective Race Williams.

Cast
Robert Warwick as Major Lewis K. Dumont
Wanda Hawley as Edith Varney
Theodore Roberts as General Harrison Randolph
Edythe Chapman as Mrs. Varney
Raymond Hatton as Lt. Howard Varney
Casson Ferguson as Wilfred Varney
Robert Cain as Captain Henry Dumont
Irving Cummings as Benton Arrelsford
Guy Oliver as Jonas
Lillian Leighton as Martha
Stanley Wheatcroft as Lt. Maxwell (*Stanhope Wheatcroft)
 Shirley Mason as Caroline Mitford

References

External links

1919 films
American silent feature films
Lost American films
American films based on plays
1919 drama films
Silent American drama films
American black-and-white films
1919 lost films
Lost drama films
1910s American films